Osu! (stylized as osu!) is a free-to-play rhythm game primarily developed, published, and created by Dean "peppy" Herbert. Inspired by iNiS' rhythm game Osu! Tatakae! Ouendan, it was written in C# on the .NET Framework, and was released for Microsoft Windows on 16 September 2007. The game has throughout the years been ported to macOS, Linux, Android and iOS.

Aside from Osu! Tatakae! Ouendan, the game has been inspired by titles such as Taiko no Tatsujin, Beatmania IIDX, EZ2DJ (EZ2CATCH), Elite Beat Agents, O2Jam, StepMania, and DJMax. All "beatmaps" in the game are community-made through the in-game map editor or through external tools. Four different game modes exist, offering various ways to play a beatmap. These modes can also be combined with optional modifiers, which can increase or decrease the difficulty.

Gameplay and features
There are four official game modes: "osu!" (called "osu! standard"), "osu!taiko", "osu!catch", and "osu!mania". With the addition of osu!lazer, players can now add custom gamemodes to the osu! client. The original osu!standard mode remains the most popular to date and as of January 2023, the game has over 19.3 million monthly active users according to the game's global country leaderboards.

"osu!standard" takes direct inspiration from Osu! Tatakae! Ouendan games. In this gamemode, the player clicks circles to the beat of a song. This is the flagship gamemode featured on the osu! website. "osu!mania" is a vertical scrolling rhythm game that mostly takes inspiration from Beatmania. The gamemode consists of notes that fall vertically in different lanes, with one key used to tap for each lane. "osu!taiko" simulates playing on taiko and is based on Taiko no Tatsujin. The final gamemode, osu!catch, is based on "EZ2CATCH", which was part of the EZ2DJ cabinet. In this gamemode, the player moves a catcher left or right in order to catch fruits falling from the top of the screen.

Each mode offers a variety of "beatmaps", which are game levels that are played to songs of different lengths, ranging from "TV size" anime openings to "marathons" surpassing 7 minutes. In osu!standard, beatmaps consist of three items – hit circles, sliders, and spinners. The objective of the game is for the player to click on these items in time to the music. These items are collectively known as "hit objects" or "circles" and are arranged in different positions on the screen (except for the spinner) at different points of time during a song. Taiko beatmaps have drumbeats and spinners. Catch beatmaps have fruits and spinners, which are arranged in a horizontally falling manner. Mania beatmaps consist of keys (depicted as a small bar) and holds. The beatmap is then played with accompanying music, simulating a sense of rhythm as the player interacts with the objects to the beat of the music. Each beatmap is accompanied by music and a background (which can be disabled). The game can be played using various peripherals: the most common setup is a graphics tablet or computer mouse to control cursor movement, paired with a keyboard or a mini keyboard with only two keys, and only the keyboard for osu!taiko, osu!catch, and osu!mania beatmaps.

The game offers a buyable extension service called osu!supporter, which grants extra features to the user. osu!supporter does not affect the ranking system or provide any in-game advantage. While osu!supporter itself is not a recurring service (meaning it is a one-off payment), it has a limited time validity ranging from 1 month to 2 years; however, multiple purchases of osu!supporter service time can be entitled to one user, allowing for longer uninterrupted service.

Community and competitive play

Community events

Osu! and its players have organized different events, such as fanart, tournaments, beatmapping contests, and conventions. The biggest unofficial event held in the community is "cavoe's osu! event" (usually referred to as "osu! event" or "COE"), held at The Brabanthallen in 's Hertogenbosch, The Netherlands. The event has been arranged three times since 2017 yearly. However, due to the COVID-19 pandemic, the 2020 and 2021 editions of the event were canceled. COE 2022, the most recent event, occurred from 1 to 7 August. COE 2023 is scheduled to be on July 31 - August 6, 2023. There were also official stands at TwitchCon and Anime Expo.

Competition
Osu! contains three main facets of competition between players. In multiplayer lobbies, up to 16 users play a map simultaneously. On individual maps, players compete for highscores on global leaderboards or against highscores set by themselves and friends. Players also compete with their ranks, which are calculated by accumulating "performance points" (pp). pp is based on a map's difficulty and the player's performance on it. In July 2019, a player, Vaxei, exceeded 1,000 pp in a single play for the first time, followed by another player, idke, less than twenty-four hours later.

Tournaments
Since established in 2011, there have been twelve annual Osu! World Cups (usually abbreviated as OWC), one for each game mode (osu!mania having two for four key and seven key). Teams for World Cups are country-based, with up to eight players per team. There are also very many different community-hosted tournaments, differing in rank range, types of maps played, and how the teams are composed. Winners of larger official tournaments typically receive prizes such as cash, merchandise, profile badges and/or osu!supporter subscriptions. For this reason, large tournaments often attract high-skill level players as well as large audiences on Twitch, this is in contrast to the smaller community tournaments, which often have small or no prizes and are not watched by many people.
These smaller tournaments comprise the vast majority of all Osu! Tournaments, and through the usage of global rank entry restrictions where you may only compete against players in your own rank range, community tournaments provide a serious competitive environment for players who may not be as highly skilled. Without these community tournaments, players would have to practice for years to have any shot at playing at the same competition level of those who are professional players in the community.

Adaptations

osu!stream 
In 2011, osu!stream was released as an adaptation of osu! for iOS devices running iOS 6 and later, also developed by Dean Herbert. The main difference between osu! and osu!stream is that osu!stream beatmaps are not user-created and are instead made by the developers of osu!stream. The version also includes some new gameplay elements.

On 26 February 2020, Herbert announced that he released the source code and plans to halt the development of the game, releasing one final update that made all the levels free to download.

On 12 January 2023, osu!stream was released for Android.

osu!droid 
osu!droid is a fanmade client that is unaffiliated with peppy, the official developer of osu!. It features the standard osu! gamemode and is only available on the Android platform.

osu!lazer 

osu!lazer is an open source rewrite of the original game client. It is intended to replace the current stable client once it gains user acceptance. New features to the game are no longer being added to the stable client; new development is focused on osu!lazer.

The development of osu!lazer began in 2015, and is currently available on Microsoft Windows, macOS, Linux, Android, and iOS. osu!lazer is written entirely in .NET (formerly .NET Core).

osu!framework 
osu!framework is an open source game framework developed with osu!lazer in mind. The goal of osu!framework development is to create a versatile and accessible game framework that goes further than most, providing things out-of-the-box such as graphics, advanced input processing, and text rendering.

Reception 
Jeuxvideo.com reviewed Osu! favorably with 18/20 points in 2015. In 2010, MMOGames.com reviewer Daniel Ball said that while the game was very similar to Elite Beat Agents, it was differentiated by its community's large library of high-quality community made content and customization. The game has been used and recommended by esports players such as Ninja and EFFECT, as a way to warm-up and practice their aim.

Notes

References

External links

 
 osu!lazer GitHub page 
 
 osu! on YouTube
 Official osu! wiki

2007 video games
IOS games
MacOS games
Music video games
Rhythm games
Open-source video games
Creative Commons-licensed video games
Indie video games
Video games developed in Australia
Windows games
Windows Phone games
Software using the MIT license